Siobhan Donovan is the name of:
Siobhan Hathaway, later Donovan, fictional character in BBC radio soap  The Archers 
Siobhan Donovan, fictional character played by Alison Doody in 1987 film A Prayer for the Dying